Ottley's is a settlement in the north of Saint Kitts in Saint Kitts and Nevis. It is located inland from the north coast on the road between Cayon and Tabernacle.

Populated places in Saint Kitts and Nevis